"Death Bed (Coffee for Your Head)", stylised in lowercase as "death bed (coffee for your head)", is a song by Canadian recording artist Powfu, featuring Filipino-British singer-songwriter Beabadoobee. The song was initially uploaded to SoundCloud and YouTube in 2019; following Powfu signing to Columbia Records and Robots + Humans, the song was released on streaming services on February 8, 2020. The song samples the 2017 song "Coffee" by Beabadoobee, who is credited as a featured artist.

The song went viral on the video sharing app TikTok and through radio airplay in early 2020. On TikTok, the song had over 4.1 billion plays for the month of March 2020 alone. The radio edit of the song altered any lyric relating to death in the song and radio hosts would refer to the song as "Coffee for Your Head".

Background
Originally released on the some boring, love stories, pt. 2 EP in February 2019, the song's commercial release was delayed by a year due to the clearance of the sample of Beabadoobee's 2017 song "Coffee". Powfu said on Twitter in April 2019 that he had not put it on Spotify because he was "scared [he'd] get in trouble from the sample [he] use[s] in it", but said he "would upload it anyway" and told his followers to give him "a week and a half". It was finally released to streaming and download services in February 2020. On May 28, 2020, a later version featured on his EP Poems of the Past, which included the original version, was released featuring American pop punk band Blink-182.

Composition
Columbia's British subsidiary Sony Music UK described it as a lo-fi hip hop single, while Aliya Chaudhry from Consequence deemed it as an emo rap song.

Music video 
The video performance was officially uploaded to Powfu's YouTube channel on April 1, 2020. As of August 25, 2022, it has accumulated more than 524 million views.

Accolades

Charts

Weekly charts

Monthly charts

Year-end charts

Certifications

Release history

References

2020 songs
2020 singles
Powfu songs
Beabadoobee songs
Number-one singles in Malaysia
Number-one singles in Singapore
Songs written by Beabadoobee
Songs written by Powfu